Abdulazeez Abubakar Ibrahim (27 November 1957 – 5 October 2021) was elected senator for the Taraba Central constituency of Taraba State, Nigeria at the start of the Nigerian Fourth Republic, running on the People's Democratic Party (PDP) platform. He took office on 29 May 1999.
He was reelected in April 2003.

Background
Ibrahim was born in 1957. He obtained degrees in Engineering and Business Administration from Ahmadu Bello University, Zaria.

Political career
After taking his seat in the Senate in June 1999 he was appointed to committees on Commerce (vice chairman), Industry, Aviation, Science & Technology, Power & Steel, National Planning and Special Projects.
In April 2005 he was among other senators interrogated by the Independent Corrupt Practices and Other Related Offences Commission (ICPC) concerning a scandal in which  Education Minister Fabian Osuji was said to have paid out N55 million in bribes so they would inflate the ministry's budget.
In the April 2007 elections he was a candidate for governor of Taraba State running on the All Nigeria People's Party (ANPP) platform.
Danbaba Suntai of the PDP was the winner.

References

1957 births
2021 deaths
Peoples Democratic Party members of the Senate (Nigeria)
All Nigeria Peoples Party politicians
People from Taraba State
Ahmadu Bello University alumni
20th-century Nigerian politicians
21st-century Nigerian politicians
Deaths from the COVID-19 pandemic in Nigeria